Labrocerus is a genus of beetles in the family Dermestidae, containing the following species:

 Labrocerus argyroxiphii Beal, 2000
 Labrocerus auratus Beal, 2000
 Labrocerus concolor Sharp in Blackburn & Sharp, 1885
 Labrocerus curticornis Sharp, 1908
 Labrocerus dasytoides Sharp, 1908
 Labrocerus depressus Sharp, 1908
 Labrocerus jaynei Sharp in Blackburn & Sharp, 1885
 Labrocerus laticornis Sharp, 1908
 Labrocerus moerens Sharp, 1908
 Labrocerus obscurus Blackburn in Blackburn & Sharp, 1885
 Labrocerus obsoletus Sharp, 1908
 Labrocerus producens Beal, 2000
 Labrocerus quadrisignatus Sharp, 1908
 Labrocerus setosus Sharp, 1908
 Labrocerus similaris Sharp, 1908
 Labrocerus suffusus Sharp, 1908
 Labrocerus vestitus Sharp, 1908

References

Dermestidae genera